Harkin Bay is an arm of the Foxe Basin in the Qikiqtaaluk Region of Nunavut, Canada. It is located on the northeastern Foxe Peninsula, in western Baffin Island.

Fauna
Polar bears frequent the area.

References

Bays of Foxe Basin